Knox County Schools is the school district that operates all public schools in Knox County, Tennessee.

History 
Before the 1987–1988 school year, the city of Knoxville and Knox County operated separate school districts. In that year the two systems were consolidated into Knox County Schools.

List of Knox County School Superintendents (1869–Present)

M.C Wilcott 1869-1873

Thomas Conner Karns 1873-1875

H.M Brothers 1875-1876

H.G Hampstead 1877-1878

Frank Smith 1879-1880

William Gibbs 1881-1883

John Shipe 1883-1885

James Saylor 1886-1888

J.C Ford 1889-1896

D.P Duggan 1897-1900

Sam Hill 1901-1907

E.R Cate 1907-1910

Monroe Wilson 1911-1917

William Stooksbury 1917-1922

William Morris 1923-1934

Leonard Brickey 1934-1946

Mildred Doyle 1946-1976

Earl Hofmeister 1976-1992

Allen Morgan 1992-1998

Roy Mullins 1998-1999

Charles Lindsey 1999-2007

Roy Mullins 2007-2008

James McIntyre 2008-2016

Buzz Thomas 2016-2017 (interim)

Bob Thomas 2017–2022

Dr. Jon Rysewyk 2022–Present

Mildred Doyle holds the record for longest time as superintendent (30 years).
Mildred Doyle is also the only women to ever hold the office of superintendent of Knox County (county or city).

Lists of Knox County City School Superintendents  (1871-1988)

Alenander Baird 1871-1875

Reverend H.T Morton 1875-1878

R.D.S Robertson 1877-1881

Albert Ruth 1881-1897

J.H. McCallie 1897-1901

Albert Ruth 1901-1907

Seymour Mynders 1907-1911

Walter Miller 1910-1924

Homer Shepherd 1926-1931

Harry Clark 1932-1941

Thomas Prince 1941-1949

Wilson New 1949-1954

Thomas Johnston 1954-1964

Olin Adams Jr. 1964-1971

Elmer Aslinger 1971-1973

Roy Wallace 1973-1975

James Newman 1975-1984

Fred Bedelle Jr. 1984-1987

Operations
Its current headquarters is in Knoxville.

It was formerly headquartered in the Andrew Johnson Building in downtown Knoxville.

Statistics 
The district has 94 schools (including 51 elementary schools, 16 middle schools, 16 high schools, 11 special schools) with 8,339 employees serving approximately 60,500 students in the cities of Knoxville and Farragut as well as all other communities in the county. There are 3,927 classroom teachers, 85 principals, and 126 assistant principals. The system has another 549 certified personnel plus 3,652 support staff. All middle and high schools are accredited by the Southern Association of Colleges and Schools and 96% of the elementary schools are accredited.

As of April 2012, there were 1,431 students enrolled in Pre-K, 27,168 K-5, 12,879 grades 6–8, 16,230 grades 9–12, and 104 in non-traditional schools. Of the student population, 76.6% are white, 5.3% Hispanic, 2.2% Asian/Pacific Island, and 13.9% African-American.

Schools
The district has a total of 88 schools within 9 districts.

Elementary schools
Knox County operates 50 elementary schools.

A. L. Lotts est. 1993
Adrian Burnett est. 1976
Amherst est. 2005
Ball Camp est. 1931
Bearden est. 1938
Beaumont Magnet Elementary and Honors/Fine Arts Academy est. 1936
Belle Morris est. 1930
Blue Grass est. 1938
Bonny Kate est. 1932
Brickey-McCloud est. 2003
Carter est. 1938
Cedar Bluff est. 1975
Chilhowee Intermediate est. 1928
Christenberry est. 1996
Copper Ridge est. 1979
Corryton est. 1936
Dogwood est. 1995
East Knox County est. 1979
Farragut Intermediate est. 1984
Farragut Primary est. 1989
Fountain City est. 1931
Gap Creek est. 1933
Gibbs est. 2006
Green Magnet Math and Science Academy est. 1956
Halls est. 1986
Hardin Valley est. 2000
Inskip est. 1948
Karns est. 1992
Lonsdale est. 1935
Maynard est. 1926
Mooreland Heights est. 1931
Mount Olive est. 1952
New Hopewell est. 1952
Northshore est. 2013
Norwood est. 1954
Pleasant Ridge est. 1948
Pond Gap est. 1954
Powell est. 1968
Ritta est. 1905 
Rocky Hill est. 1940
Sarah Moore Greene Magnet Technology Academy est. 1972
Sequoyah est. 1930
Shannondale est. 1955
South Knoxville est. 1955
Spring Hill est. 1955
Sterchi  est. 1959
Sunnyview Primary est. 1963
West Haven est. 1958
West Hills est. 1958
West View est. 1950

Middle schools
The district operates 16 middle schools, enrolling grades 6–8.

Bearden Middle est. 1978
Carter Middle est. 1948
Cedar Bluff Middle est. 1964
Farragut Middle est. 1984
Gibbs Middle est. 2018
Gresham Middle est. 1931
Halls Middle est. 1981
Hardin Valley Middle est. 2018
Holston Middle est. 1957
Karns Middle est. 1974
Northwest Middle est. 1966
Powell Middle est. 1974
South-Doyle Middle est. 1967
Vine Middle est. 1951
West Valley Middle est. 1999
Whittle Springs Middle est. 1959

High schools
The district operates 15 high schools. These are:

 Austin-East High School, Knoxville est. 1951
 Bearden High School, Knoxville est. 1939
 Carter High School, Strawberry Plains est. 1915
 Career Magnet Academy, located at Pellissippi State Community College 
 Central High School, Knoxville est. 1906, relocated 1971
 Farragut High School, Farragut est. 1904
 Fulton High School, Knoxville est. 1951
 Gibbs High School, Corryton est. 1913
 Halls High School, Halls Crossroads est. 1916
 Hardin Valley Academy, western Knox County est. 2008
 Karns High School, Karns est. 1913
 L&N STEM Academy est. 2011, located in former L&N railroad station 
 Powell High School, Powell est. 1949
 South-Doyle High School, southern Knox County est. 1967
 West High School, Knoxville est. 1951

Special schools
There are 10 Knox County schools offering special or non-traditional programs. Included are three vocational high school programs:
 Byington-Solway Career and Technical Education Center, located at Karns High School
 Lincoln Park Technology and Trade Center
 North Knox Career and Technical Education Center, located at Halls High School

The Knox County Adult High School offers day and evening high school classes for adult students (age 18 and older) desiring to complete a regular high school diploma. It is housed in the historic Knoxville High School building.

Knox County public preschools are:
 Fair Garden Preschool
 Sam E. Hill Family Community Center

Other special schools are:
 Fort Sanders Educational Development Center, offering special education services, primarily for children of preschool age
 The Knoxville Adaptive Education Center, a special school for students with mental health needs, including three elementary, three middle, and seven high school classrooms at the school, plus similar "satellite" classrooms in other county schools
 Richard Yoakley Alternative School
 Ridgedale Alternative School
 Dr. Paul L. Kelley Volunteer Academy

Governance 
Knox County Schools is governed by a nine-member elected board of education and directed by an appointed superintendent. The Knox County board of education includes Susan Horn, Virginia Babb, Reverend Dr. John Butler, Jennifer Owen, Daniel Watson, Betsy Henderson, Patti Bounds, Mike McMillan, and Kristi Kristy. In addition the board has a student representative, Grace Deckard, who is a non-voting member. Dr. Jon Rysewyk currently serves as the Superintendent.

References

External links
 Knox County Schools

School districts in Tennessee
Education in Knox County, Tennessee
Knoxville, Tennessee
School districts established in 1987